James F. Laatsch is a former member of the Wisconsin State Assembly.

Biography
Laatsch was born on April 16, 1940, in Tigerton, Wisconsin. He graduated from Concordia College, Concordia Senior College, and Concordia Seminary. Laatsch is married with three children.

Career
Laatsch was elected to the Assembly in 1978 and re-elected in 1980. In 1982, he was defeated by Robert Thompson. He is a Republican.

References

Concordia Seminary alumni
People from Tigerton, Wisconsin
1940 births
Living people
Republican Party members of the Wisconsin State Assembly